The Argus-Press is a daily newspaper published in Owosso, Michigan. The name comes from two preceding papers: the Evening Argus and Press-American, which merged in 1916. The paper's earliest antecedent is the Owosso American, which was founded in 1854.

See also
 WOAP

References

External links 
 

Newspapers published in Michigan
Newspapers established in 1854
1854 establishments in Michigan